Diane Griffin may refer to:
 Diane Griffin (biologist)
 Diane Griffin (conservationist)